Nimmi Ramanujam is the Robert W. Carr Professor of Biomedical Engineering, and a faculty member in the Global Health Institute and the Department of Pharmacology & Cell Biology at Duke University. She is the director of the Center of Global Women's Health Technologies (GWHT) and founder of Zenalux Biomedical Inc. and Calla Health. Ramanujam has spent the last two decades developing precision diagnostics and more recently precision therapeutics for breast and cervical cancer, with a focus on addressing global health disparities. She has more than 20 patents and over 150 publications for screening, diagnostic, and surgical applications, and has raised over $30M of funding to pursue these innovations through a variety of funding mechanisms, including NIH R01s and R21s, NIH Bioengineering Partnerships, NCI Academic Industry Partnerships, NIH Small Business grants and USAID funding. As the founding director of the Center for Global Women's Health Technologies at Duke University, she has developed a consortium of over 50+ partners including international academic institutions and hospitals, non-governmental organizations, ministries of health, and commercial partners; this consortium is working to ensure that the technologies developed at the center are adopted by cancer control programs in geographically and economically diverse healthcare settings.

Research and career 
Ramanujam's research on women's cancers has centered on translational and laboratory research of relevance to breast and cervical cancer. While her guiding principles are similar across breast and cervical cancer, the technical challenges needed to tackle these cancers are inherently different. In the case of cervical cancer prevention, her focus is to develop strategies that reduce attrition to treatment including early screening and diagnostics. In the breast cancer care cascade, clinical care has principally pivoted towards a focus on how to inform the effectiveness of cancer therapy whether it is surgery or systemic therapy, and that is where she has focused her efforts via molecular and metabolic imaging. A third area in her research program focuses on low cost ablative strategies for local control of cancer in resource limited settings. She has also created two companies, Zenalux and Calla Health, to commercialize her breast and cervical imaging products, respectively. Additionally, she has created three social innovations programs, WISH to impact cervical cancer prevention in low resource settings, IGNITE to scale social innovation education to students globally and the Calla Campaign to bridge inequities in sexual and reproductive health inequities through story-telling and art.

She has received recognition for her work through the TR100 Young Innovator Award from MIT, the Global Indus Technovator award from MIT, Era of Hope Scholar awards from the DOD, the Stasnell Family award from the Pratt School of Engineering at Duke, the Emerging Leader in Global Health Award from the Consortium of Universities in Global Health, the Social Impact Abie Award from AnitaB.org, the Biophotonics Technology Innovator Award from the International Society for Optics and Photonics, and the Women in Molecular Imaging Leadership Award (WIMIN) from the World Molecular Imaging Congress (WMIC). She is a fellow of several optical and biomedical engineering societies including OSA, SPIE and AIMBE. She has also been elected to the National Academy of Inventors and is a Fulbright fellow. She is co-editor of the Handbook of Biomedical Optics. She has presented the global impact of her work at the United Nations. She has been a TedX speaker.

Honors and awards 
Ramanujam has won numerous awards including:

MIT TR100 Award, 2003
MIT Indus Technovator Award, 2005
DOD Era of Hope Scholar award, 2005
DOD Era of Hope Research Scholar award, 2009
Fellow of the Optical Society of America, 2009
Fellow of the American Institute for Medical and Biological Engineering (AIMBE), 2012
Fellow of SPIE, 2013
Robert W. Carr Jr., Professor of Engineering, Duke University, 2014
National Academy of Inventors Fellow, 2017
Emerging Global Health Leader, Consortium of the Universities of Global Health, 2017
Social Impact Abie Award, AnitaB.org 2019
Fulbright Global Scholar Fellowship, 2019
WIMIN Leadership Award, World Molecular Imaging Society, 2019 
SPIE Biophotonics Technology Innovator Award, 2020
The Optical Society Michael S. Feld Biophotonics Award, 2020

Recent publications 
Ramanujam's publications include:

Patents 
Ramanujam is an inventor of 20 US patents, including:
Systems and methods for spectral analysis of a tissue mass using an instrument, an optical probe, and a Monte Carlo or a diffusion algorithm 
Method for extraction of optical properties from diffuse reflectance spectra 
Depth-resolved fluorescence instrument with angled excitation 
Smart Fiber Optic Sensor System and Methods for Quantitative Optical Spectroscopy.

References 

American biomedical engineers
Cancer researchers
21st-century American women scientists
Duke University faculty
Year of birth missing (living people)
Living people
Fellows of Optica (society)
Fellows of the American Institute for Medical and Biological Engineering
Fellows of SPIE
University of Texas at Austin alumni
American women academics